The Dubai Triangular Series was a One Day International cricket tournament held in the United Arab Emirates from 8 to 19 January 2015. It was a tri-nation series between Afghanistan, Ireland and Scotland as a warm-up for the 2015 Cricket World Cup. Ireland finished top of the table after a no result in the final match.

Squads

1 Max Sorensen replaced Tim Murtagh in the squad for the final match, and the upcoming World Cup, as Tim Murtagh broke his foot on 7 January 2015.

Points table

Points system

In a match declared as no result, run rate is not applicable.

Won (W): 2
Lost (L): 0
No Result (NR): 1
Tie (T): 1

Net run rate (NRR): Runs per over scored less runs per over conceded, adjusting team batting first to overs of team batting second in rain rule matches, adjusting to team's full allocation if all out, and ignoring no result matches.

ODI series

1st ODI

2nd ODI

3rd ODI

4th ODI

5th ODI

6th ODI

See also
Three earlier triangular series featuring ICC associate members:

 Associates Triangular Series in Kenya in 2006–07
 Associates Triangular Series in South Africa in 2006–07
 Associates Triangular Series in West Indies in 2006–07

References

External links
 Series Home at ESPN Cricinfo

2015 in Afghan cricket
2015 in Irish cricket
2015 in Scottish cricket
International cricket competitions in 2014–15
2015 in Emirati cricket
Cricket in the United Arab Emirates